General Pearce may refer to:

Cheryl Pearce (fl. 1980s–2020s), Australian Army major general
Les Pearce (general) (1918–2002), New Zealand Army major general
Nicholas Bartlett Pearce (1828–1894), Arkansas State Troops brigadier general in the American Civil War
Thomas Pearce (British Army officer) (c. 1670–1739), General of his Majesty's Forces in Ireland

See also
General Pierce (disambiguation)